"Play Guitar Play" is a song written and recorded by American country music artist Conway Twitty.  It was released in February 1977 as the second single and title track from the album Play Guitar Play.  The song was Twitty's 19th number one on the country chart.  "Play Guitar Play" stayed at number one for a single week and spent a total of 13 weeks on the country chart.

Cover versions
The song was also recorded by Charley Pride and his version is on his 1978 album Someone Loves You Honey.

Charts

Weekly charts

Year-end charts

References
 

1977 singles
1977 songs
Conway Twitty songs
Charley Pride songs
Songs written by Conway Twitty
Song recordings produced by Owen Bradley
MCA Records singles